Narli Aji Su (also Romanized as Nārlī Ājī Sū; also known as Nārlī-ye Pā’īn) is a village in Maraveh Tappeh Rural District, in the Central District of Maraveh Tappeh County, Golestan Province, Iran. At the 2006 census, its population was 1,029, in 175 families.

References 

Populated places in Maraveh Tappeh County